Exelastis phlyctaenias is a moth of the family Pterophoridae. It is known from the Virgin Islands, the islands of Luzon and Palawan in the Philippines, Sri Lanka, Tanzania, Kenya and India (Coorg), Burundi, Comoros, Congo, Ivory Coast, Ethiopia, La Réunion, Mauritius, Madagascar, Malawi and South Africa.

The wingspan is 15–16 mm. Adults are on wing in October on the Virgin Islands.

Larvae have been recorded on Anacardium occidentale (Cashew tree) (Anacardiaceae) and Cajanus indicus (Fabaceae).

References
Meyrick, E. 1911f. Descriptions of Indian Microlepidoptera. - Journal of the Bombay Natural History Society 21:104–106.

Exelastini
Moths of Madagascar
Moths of Asia
Lepidoptera of Ethiopia
Lepidoptera of Malawi
Lepidoptera of South Africa
Lepidoptera of Tanzania
Moths of Africa
Moths of Réunion
Moths described in 1911